Attigny is the name of two communes in France:

 Attigny, Ardennes, in the Ardennes département
 Attigny, Vosges, in the Vosges département